Kirk Shermer is a retired American soccer goalkeeper who was the 1983 Major Indoor Soccer League Rookie of the Year.

Shermer attended Fresno State University where he played on the men’s soccer from 1978 to 1981. He was a 1981 Second Team All American. On December 14, 1981, the Tampa Bay Rowdies selected Shermer in the fourth round of the North American Soccer League college draft.  He did not sign with the Rowdies.  In 1982, the Los Angeles Lazers selected Shermer in the Major Indoor Soccer League draft.  He rapidly asserted himself as a top goalkeeper and was named the 1983 MISL Rookie of the Year.  He began the 1983-1984 season, played eleven games, then retired.

References

External links
 MISL stats

Living people
1960 births
Sportspeople from Fresno, California
Soccer players from California
American soccer players
Fresno State Bulldogs men's soccer players
Los Angeles Lazers players
Major Indoor Soccer League (1978–1992) players
Tampa Bay Rowdies draft picks
Association football goalkeepers